Justin Morrill Hall, known almost exclusively as Morrill Hall, is an academic building of Cornell University on its Ithaca, New York campus. As of 2009 it houses the Departments of Romance Studies, Russian Literature, and Linguistics. The building is named in honor of Justin Smith Morrill, who as Senator from Vermont was the primary proponent of the Morrill Land-Grant Colleges Act of 1862 which greatly assisted the founding of Cornell University. Morrill Hall was declared a National Historic Landmark in 1965.

History 
Morrill Hall was the University's first newly constructed building, built at a cost of $70,111 and opening on October 7, 1868 as South University Building, or less formally, as South Hall. It is the southernmost of the three buildings which comprise the "Stone Row" which forms the west side of Cornell's Arts Quadrangle, all constructed of Ithaca bluestone quarried from the base of Libe Slope. An early Cornell professor, Goldwin Smith, said dismissively of these three buildings that "nothing can redeem them but dynamite." While all three of these historic buildings remain standing, each has undergone periods of extensive renovation to overcome the limitations of their original structural designs.

While the building primarily provides a home for language-related departments such as Romance Studies, Russian Literature, and Linguistics, Morrill Hall has previously served as the headquarters for a much broader variety of departments. Notably, the fourth floor of the building housed the Cornell Law School in its entirety when it first opened in 1887. Also, the Psychology Department was located in Morrill Hall until its current headquarters were established in Uris Hall, and the "university Co-Operative store, familiarly the 'Co-Op'" was located in the basement of Morrill during the early 20th century.

Architecture 

The exterior architectural style of Morrill Hall has been alternatively described as Second Empire and Italian Renaissance. The structure was originally divided into three distinct sections: a southern wing containing student residential suites with room for sixty students; a central academic wing for classrooms, the library, and an auditorium; and a northern wing containing offices. Originally, the sections were not interconnected, and moving from one to the other required exiting and re-entering the building. This segmented structure was designed as a safety feature, as a fire in one wing of the building would be less likely to spread to the other two sections of the structure. The partitions between the three segments of the building were demolished in 1897 as part of a large-scale renovation.

The buildings comprising the Stone Row- Morrill Hall, McGraw Hall, and White Hall- all face westward toward Libe Slope, as the university originally intended to develop the slope area with further construction projects. Later construction efforts, however, focused on the area east of the three historical buildings, leaving them facing the "wrong way." Morrill Hall's current interior layout, following a 1973 remodeling, thus runs counter to the original exterior orientation. The structure's three primary entrances and main reception area all open to the eastern face of the building on the Arts Quadrangle, with only one of the original western entrances still in use. Thus, the exterior "front" of the building now serves functionally as the back of the building.

References

School buildings completed in 1866
National Historic Landmarks in New York (state)
Cornell University buildings
University and college buildings on the National Register of Historic Places in New York (state)
1866 establishments in New York (state)
National Register of Historic Places in Tompkins County, New York